Larissa Vladimirovna Zamotina (born 25 June 1967) is a Russian former competitive figure skater who competed for the Soviet Union. She is the 1987 Winter Universiade champion, 1990 NHK Trophy bronze medalist, and two-time Soviet national bronze medalist.

Zamotina was coached by Igor Ksenofontov. After her retirement from competition, she performed with Disney on Ice, appearing in Hercules. In 2008, she was named a technical specialist for singles on the regional level at U.S. Figure Skating.She is now married and coaches at the Robert Crown ice arena. She has a daughter named Alina Bonillo.

Competitive highlights

References 

Soviet female single skaters
Living people
1967 births
Figure skaters from Saint Petersburg
Universiade medalists in figure skating
Universiade gold medalists for the Soviet Union
Universiade silver medalists for the Soviet Union
Competitors at the 1987 Winter Universiade
Competitors at the 1989 Winter Universiade